Deer Park also known as Aditya Nath Jha Deer Park, is a natural park in Delhi located in the subdivision of Hauz Khas in South Delhi. It was named after famous social worker Aditya Nath Jha.  This place is popular for walking, jogging and weekend outings. Deer Park comprises many subsections such as Duck Park, Picnic Spots Rabbit Enclosures etc. The park is accessible from Safdarjung Enclave and Green Park, Hauz Khas Village. It is also connected to District Park thus making it approachable from R K Puram near the courts side of the Delhi Lawn Tennis Association.

Location
The Deer Park along with the connected District Park (that houses the Hauz Khas lake) and adjacent Rose Garden (accessible from IIT Delhi and Safdarjung Development Area) make up one of the largest green areas in New Delhi and are collectively called "the lungs of Delhi" because they provide fresh air in the otherwise polluted hustling bustling mega metropolitan Delhi.
A simmering water body makes it more attractive and is the perfect haunt of nature lovers. The park is easy to arrive at from Hauz khas Village, Safdarjang Enclave and Delhi Lawn Tennis Associations Courts.

Biodiversity Park 
The Park has four different wings i.e. Rose Garden, Deer Park, Fountain & District Park, Old Monuments and Hauz Khas Art Market. One can enjoy the entire area, once inside the park one cannot believe to be in the heart of Delhi. Besides the above the Park has a beautiful restaurant "Park Baluchi" the right place to enjoy a day trip.

It is called Deer Park because it actually houses a large number of deer inside the park. There is a large enclosure in the park for deer to roam around, play with each other, have an occasional friendly fight and provide a learning and entertaining experience to the visitors especially the children. Entry to the Deer Park and the surrounding green park is free and it is open everyday from 5:00 AM to 8:00 PM during summer till October and 5:30 AM to 7:00 PM during winter.

Governance 

The park is maintained by the Delhi Development Authority, a government planning authority.

Landmarks and structures

Art and monuments

Structures

Munda Gumbad is a rubble pavilion north west to the Hauz Khas lake. It is said to be once located at the center of the lake. The structure was built by Alauddin Khilji of the Khilji dynasty in 1295 AD.

The structure at the moment is built on a raised platform. It is square in shape, with arches on all four sides, allowing passage inside the inner chamber.

Gallery

References 

Parks in Delhi
Tourist attractions in Delhi
Protected areas with year of establishment missing